The Zenith was a Cruise ship built in 1992 by Meyer Werft, Papenburg, Germany for Celebrity Cruises as Zenith. After a career for Pullmantur Cruises and Croisières de France she was sold for scrapping in Alang, India in 2022.

History
The Zenith was built as a sister ship to Celebrity Cruises' first newbuild MV Horizon. Ship designer was yacht designer Jan Bannenberg. Her interiors were designed by Michael Katsourakis and British designer John McNeece. The Zenith was delivered in February 1992 and set under Liberian flag. She was used for cruises from Florida to the Caribbean and Bermuda islands. In 2002 she was reflagged in the Bahamas. In 2007 she was transferred to Pullmantur Cruises and used for cruises around the Mediterranean.

A seven-night cruise from 11 to 18 March 1995 aboard The Zenith is the subject of David Foster Wallace's 1995 essay "A Supposedly Fun Thing I'll Never Do Again" (collected in a collection of the same name and originally published in Harper's as "Shipping Out"). Wallace refers to the Zenith as the Nadir throughout (although he insists "the rechristening's nothing particular against the ship itself").

In 2014, The Zenith was moved to the fleet of CDF Croisières de France, joining her sister ship the L'Horizon.

CDF Croisières de France brand was discontinued in early 2017. The Zenith returned to the fleet of Pullmantur Cruises in 2017.

In July 2019 it was announced the ship would leave Pullmantur's fleet in early 2020 to Peace Boat, with fleetmate Monarch poised to take over The Zeniths existing sailings.

In September 2020 Cruise Capital informed according to Hong Kong Cruise Society, Peace Boat is to replace the contracts of two ships Ocean Dream and The Zenith from service, replacing them with one larger ship that they had purchased—the current , to be renamed Pacific World from Spring 2021.

In May 2022, Peace Boat announced that all cruises in 2022 and 2023 to be operated by The Zenith were cancelled due to a change in contract with the owner company. She was laid up in Lavrio, Greece, but left the port on 8 June as TSM Singapore heading to Hai Phong, Vietnam. In September of 2022 she has been renamed to Singa and has been sold for scrap in Alang, India. She never sailed for Peace Boat.

Fires 
The ship was damaged at the stern on 8 August 2009 when a fire broke out. It was at that moment moored at Frihamnen in Stockholm.

On 26 June 2013 another fire aboard the ship broke out, this time in its engine room causing it to lose power. It had to anchor 17 miles off the coast of Venice, Italy, before four tugboats came to tow it to port. One week later it went to the S.Marco shipyard in the port of Trieste.

Gallery

References

External links

 Celebrity Cruises
 A video clip of Zenith (in Pullmantur livery) leaving Rhodos
 The Zenith page on Croisières de France website

Ships built in Papenburg
Ships of Celebrity Cruises
Ships of Pullmantur Cruises
Ships of Croisières de France Cruises
1991 ships